Robert Chipman (born May 18, 1951) is an American retired college basketball coach who coached Washburn University from 1979 to 2017. He is the 24th-winningest coach in college basketball history, with 808 wins.

His 1986–1987 Washburn team won the NAIA national championship, and his 2000–2001 team was the NCAA Division II national runner-up.

His 1992–1993 Washburn team advanced to the Elite 8 of the NCAA Men's Division II Basketball Championship, and his 2000–2001 team advanced to the championship game of the NCAA Men's Division II Basketball Championship.

See also
 List of college men's basketball coaches with 600 wins

References

1951 births
Living people
American men's basketball coaches
American men's basketball players
College men's basketball head coaches in the United States
Guards (basketball)
Junior college men's basketball players in the United States
Kansas State Wildcats men's basketball players
Washburn Ichabods men's basketball coaches